Abdul-Hadi Al-Hariri (born 7 April 1982 in Syria) is a Syrian footballer. He currently plays for Al-Majd in the Syrian Premier League.

External links 
 Career stats at Kooora.com (Arabic)
 Career stats at goalzz.com

Living people
Syrian footballers
Syrian expatriate footballers
Association football forwards
Al-Majd players
1982 births
Syrian expatriate sportspeople in Jordan
Syrian Premier League players